World of Miracles is a 1959 Italian melodrama film directed by Luigi Capuano.

Plot    
Laura and Marco are two young lovers who act for a theater company. But one day Marco, having come into conflict with her father, who is an old actor, leaves the company to seek greater fortune in Rome, in the world of cinema.

Laura, after some time, is moved by a letter full of affection that Marco sent her, so she joins him in Rome, where he has rented a room from Franca, a good woman who tries to advise him well and who feels happy to welcome Laura in their own home. But the couple is put in crisis by the presence - unexpected for Laura - of another woman, a snobbish actress who seeks Marco's company and often calls him to invite him to her hotel room.

Laura, saddened, then returns to her father, who, due to too many emotions, dies during a performance on the stage of the theater. Meanwhile, Marco understands more and more that he does not want to give up on Laura's love.

Cast 
 Virna Lisi: Laura Damiani 
 Jacques Sernas: Marco Valenti 
 Marisa Merlini: Franca 
 Aldo Silvani: Alessandro Damiani 
 Elli Parvo: Magda Damiani 
 Kerima: Carmen Herrera 
 Yvonne Sanson: Sarah 
 Vittorio De Sica: Director Pietro Giordani 
 Amedeo Nazzari: Presenter at the press conference
 Andrea Checchi: Cinematographer 
 Silvio Bagolini:  Stationmaster 
 Ignazio Leone: Il capo comparse  
 Virgilio Riento: Oscaretto  
 Marco Tulli: Adriano 
 Leopoldo Valentini: Casimirio 
 Ciccio Barbi: Commendatore Berbloni  
 Bruno Corelli: Max
 Mario Brega: Man with a black eye
 Fanfulla  
 Pietro Tordi

References

External links

1959 films
1959 romantic drama films
Films directed by Luigi Capuano
Italian romantic drama films
1950s Italian films